Lady Sohwangjuwon was the daughter of Sun-Haeng who became the 25th wife of Taejo of Goryeo. Since in her name was added "Little" (소, 小), so it seems that her relative became Taejo's wife too and the most suitable was Lady Hwangjuwon. Due to this, it was presumed that Lady Sohwangjuwon also came from the Hwangju Hwangbo clan.

References

External links
소황주원부인 on Encykorea .

Year of birth unknown
Year of death unknown
Consorts of Taejo of Goryeo
People from North Hwanghae